Coronel Macedo is a municipality in the state of São Paulo in Brazil. The population is 4,635 (2020 est.) in an area of 304 km². The elevation is 624 m.

References

Municipalities in São Paulo (state)